Candido Vitali (1680–1753) was an Italian painter of the late Baroque period. He was born in Bologna. He trained under Cignani and devoted himself to painting still lifes of animals, birds, flower, and fruit.

References

1680 births
1753 deaths
17th-century Italian painters
Italian male painters
18th-century Italian painters
Painters from Bologna
Italian Baroque painters
Italian still life painters
18th-century Italian male artists